The 2012 Open Saint-Gaudens Midi-Pyrénées was a professional tennis tournament played on outdoor clay courts. It was the 16th edition of the tournament which was part of the 2012 ITF Women's Circuit. It took place in Saint-Gaudens, France, on 14–20 May 2012.

Singles entrants

Seeds 

 1 Rankings as of 7 May 2012

Other entrants 
The following players received wildcards into the singles main draw:
  Jessica Ginier
  Myrtille Georges
  Victoria Larrière
  Tatjana Malek

The following players received entry from the qualifying draw:
  Naomi Broady
  Richèl Hogenkamp
  Mervana Jugić-Salkić
  Melanie Oudin

The following players received entry as lucky losers:
  Leticia Costas
  Inés Ferrer Suárez

The following players received entry by a Junior Exempt:
  Irina Khromacheva

Champions

Singles 

  Mariana Duque def.  Claire Feuerstein 4–6, 6–3, 6–2

Doubles 

  Vesna Dolonc /  Irina Khromacheva def.  Naomi Broady /  Julia Glushko 6–2, 6–0

External links 
 ITF Search
 Official website

2012 ITF Women's Circuit
Engie
2012 in French tennis